Prisoners of the Casbah is a 1953 American adventure film directed by Richard L. Bare and starring Gloria Grahame, Cesar Romero and Turhan Bey.

The film's art direction was by Paul Palmentola.

Plot

Cast
 Gloria Grahame as Princess Nadja / Yasmin  
 Cesar Romero as Firouz  
 Turhan Bey as Ahmed  
 Nestor Paiva as Marouf  
 Paul Newlan 1st Thief  
 Frank Richards as 2nd Thief  
 John Parrish as 3rd Thief  
 Lucille Barkley as Soura 
 Philip Van Zandt as Selim  
 Wade Crosby as Yagoub 
 Gloria Saunders as Zeida  
 Eddie Fields as Abdullah 
 Baynes Barron as Guard  
 Mimi Borrel as Slave Girl  
 John Crawford as Guard  
 Frank Ellis as Soldier  
 William Fawcett as Snake Charmer 
 Eddie Foster as Rashid  
 Leonard P. Geer as Thief  
 Nelson Leigh as Emir  
 John Mansfield as Mokar  
 Paul Marion as Arab Dog  
 John Marshall as Ayub 
 Ray Singer as Yussem  
 Willetta Smith as Slave Girl

References

Bibliography
 Lentz, Robert J. Gloria Grahame, Bad Girl of Film Noir: The Complete Career. McFarland, 1981.

External links
 
Review of film at Variety

1953 films
1953 adventure films
American adventure films
Films directed by Richard L. Bare
Columbia Pictures films
1950s English-language films
1950s American films